Marrella may refer to:

 Marrella, an ancient arthropod
 Fabrizio Marrella, a professor of international law

Marela may refer to:
 Marela (town), a town and sub-prefecture in Guinea
 Marela (butterfly), a genus of butterflies of the Eudaminae subfamily, found in South America
 Briana Marela, American musician

Marella may refer to:
 Marella Agnelli (born 1927), Italian fashion and style icon
 Marella Mamoun (born 1982), Syrian swimmer
 Michel Marella (born 1946), French footballer
 Joey Marella (1963–1994), American wrestling referee
 Paolo Marella (1895–1984), Italian cardinal
 Olinto Marella (1882–1969), Italian Roman Catholic priest
 Robert Marella (1937–1999), American wrestler
 Santino Marella (born 1979), Canadian wrestler
 Marella Redek, a character in the teen novel series Keeper of the Lost Cities by Shannon Messenger
 Marella Salamat (born 1993/1994), Filipina cyclist

See also 
 Morella (disambiguation)
 Mariella (disambiguation)